Kentucky is the fifth studio album from black metal band Panopticon. The album combines styles of bluegrass and Appalachian music with black metal. The album has strong political and environmentalism themes.

Track listing

References 

2012 albums
Black metal albums by American artists